T. penangiana  may refer to:
 Tainia penangiana, an Asian orchid species in genus Tainia
 Ternstroemia penangiana, a Malesian tree species
 Thelypteris penangiana, a synonym for Pronephrium penangianum, a fern species